The canton of Pays Tyrossais is an administrative division of the Landes department, southwestern France. It was created at the French canton reorganisation which came into effect in March 2015. Its seat is in Saint-Vincent-de-Tyrosse.

It consists of the following communes:
 
Bénesse-Maremne
Capbreton
Josse
Labenne
Orx
Sainte-Marie-de-Gosse
Saint-Jean-de-Marsacq
Saint-Martin-de-Hinx
Saint-Vincent-de-Tyrosse
Saubion
Saubrigues

References

Cantons of Landes (department)